Rebecca Natani Hill is an Australian comedian, writer, presenter, actor, director, and YouTuber born in Adelaide who is now based in the UK.

Career
She incorporates arts and crafts into her stand-up routines in something she calls paper puppetry. It can be likened to pop-up books or the Japanese storytelling technique Kamishibai.

Hill took part in the first edition of the UK Kids' Comedy Festival, part of the 2019 Leicester Comedy Festival. Her show, "Bec Hill Treats You Like a Child", won the festival's award for Best Kids Show.

In 2016, she was a co-host of Sky's "DC Fancast" and "DC Fancast: Unmasked" with Des Taylor and Rick Edwards. She has also appeared on several series of CBBC's panel show The Dog Ate My Homework, and starred in the 2014 Sundance UK Grand Jury Prize-winning short film "Russian Roulette", directed by Ben Aston.

In February 2021, she appeared on Channel 4's 8 Out of 10 Cats Does Countdown (episode 5 from series 21) alongside Susie Dent in Dictionary Corner.

She hosts podcasts including A Problem Squared with Matt Parker, The DesignSpark Podcast, and Con Sessions.

She has collaborated with Jay Foreman on three of his YouTube videos, entitled "Dinosaurs", "Fiddle With Your Balls" and "Robot Olympics".

Hill also presents CITV show Makeaway Takeaway, an arts-and-crafts comedy sketch show for 6–11-year-olds.

Awards and recognition
Her one-liners have featured in best-joke lists for media outlets such as The Telegraph, Dave, The Guardian, The Independent, Daily Record and Buzzfeed. She has also appeared in a worst-joke list. She has also written for The Amazing World of Gumball, Bluestone 42 and The Now Show. Her short animation directorial debut, "Scoring Pointes", aired on Disney XD in 2016.

Hill won two awards for her shows at the 2014 Edinburgh Festival. "Bec And Tom's Awesome Laundry", a children's show performed with Tom Goodliffe, won a ThreeWeeks Editors' Award. Her show "Ellipsis" won the Barry Award for Best Performer, voted on by other performers at the Fringe.

Publications
In 2021, Hill worked with Hachette to publish a series of children's books, Horror Heights.

Books

References

External links
 
 
 

Australian women comedians
Actresses from Adelaide
Living people
1986 births